Max Bohatsch was an Austrian figure skater. He was the 1905 European champion and a three-time World medalist, winning silver in 1905 and 1907, and bronze in 1903.

Results

Navigation

Austrian male single skaters
Year of birth missing
Year of death missing
World Figure Skating Championships medalists
European Figure Skating Championships medalists